Road to Forever is the second solo studio album by Don Felder, the first since 1983. It was released on October 9, 2012.

Contributors to the album include Randy Jackson, Crosby, Stills and Nash, Steve Lukather, David Paich and Steve Porcaro of Toto, and Tommy Shaw of Styx. It was produced by Felder along with Robin DiMaggio.

The album was conceived and written out of the pain Felder felt following the breakup of his marriage in 2000, and his dismissal from the Eagles soon after.

On December 17, 2013, the album was reissued as "Road To Forever - Extended Edition" on the iTunes Store and Amazon MP3 Store. Two of the four bonus tracks, "Can't Stop Now" and "Southern Bound" were previously only available on the Japanese pressing of the CD. "Sensuality" had been an iTunes Store-exclusive and "She Runs Free" had been an Amazon MP3 Store - exclusive. "Give My Life", the final track on the CD, remains the last track on the Extended Edition and appears after the four bonus tracks. The single "You Don't Have Me" made it to #1 and stayed in the top ten for 11 weeks on the Classic Rock Radio charts and the previous single "Wash Away" reached #4 between Eric Clapton and The Rolling Stones.

Track listing 
"Fall From the Grace of Love"                    3:47 
"Girls in Black"                                 3:39
"Wash Away"                                      4:18
I Believe in You"                                3:58
"You Don't Have Me"                              3:47
"Money"                                          4:11
"Someday"                                        4:13
"Heal Me"                                        7:23
"Over You"                                       4:09
"Road to Forever"                                4:59
"Life's Lullaby"                                 4:21
"Can't Stop Now" [Extended Edition Bonus Track]  4:25
"Southern Bound" [Extended Edition Bonus Track]  3:57
"She Runs Free" [Extended Edition Bonus Track]   4:01
"Sensuality" [Extended Edition Bonus Track]      3:47
"Give My Life"                                   4:04

Personnel 
 Don Felder and Robin DiMaggio – producers
 Ed Cherney – engineer, mixing
 Steven Miller – additional engineering
 Mark Needham, Mikal Blue – recording engineers
 Will Briere – second engineer
 Don Felder – all guitars, lead and background vocals
Background vocals on “Fall From the Grace of Love”: David Crosby, Stephen Stills & Graham Nash
Background vocals on “Road to Forever”: Leah Felder
Bass on “Someday” Randy Jackson
Piano, keyboards, string arrangement and background vocals: Timothy Drury
Piano, Hammond and Rhodes: David Paich
Background vocals on “Heal Me” and “Wash Away”: Tommy Shaw
Keys: Steve Porcaro
Percussions: Lenny Castro
Hammond B3: Michael Finnigan
Guitar on “Road To Forever”: Steve Lukather
Background Vocals: Charlotte Gibson
Keyboards: Michael Bearden
Bass & Background Vocals on “Heal Me”: Bahkiti Kumalo
Guitar & Background Vocals on “Heal Me”: Vincent Nguini
Background Vocals on “Heal Me” & “Money ”: Sean Holt
Bass: Chris Chaney
Bass: Leland Sklar
Keyboards: Alex Allesandroni
Pedal Steel: Greg Leisz
Background Vocals on “Money” & “Road to Forever”: Shane August
Drums, Acoustic Piano, Keyboard Programming & Percussions: Robin DiMaggio
Management: Red Light Management, Charlie Brusco
Photography: Michael Helms, Myriam Santos
Art Direction & Design: Brian Porizek

References

Don Felder albums
2012 albums